John Edward Clement Twarowski White, CBE, FSA (4 October 1924 – 6 November 2021) was a British art historian and was formerly the head of the Department of History of Art at the University College London (UCL). In 1992 he was made an Honorary Fellow of UCL. He was also the author of a number of books on Medieval and Renaissance art, as well as on the artist Duccio of Siena.

Biography
White went straight from Ampleforth College to the Royal Air Force, where he became a Spitfire flying instructor based in Canada. After the war he returned to the United Kingdom  and became a student of Anthony Blunt at the Courtauld Institute of Art, University of London. White has a number of mentions in Blunt's biography.

White then went to  Cambridge University, He then took a succession of academic positions; first, at the Art History department at Johns Hopkins University, then Alexander White Visiting Professor at the University of Chicago (1958); then Pilkington Professor of history of art at University of Manchester and director of Whitworth Art Gallery 1959–66, then Ferens Visiting professor of fine art the University of Hull 1961–62; then Chairman of the Art Advisory Panel NW Museum and Art Gallery Services 1966–66; then professor of history of art and chairman Department of History of Art Johns Hopkins University Baltimore 1977–71; UCL: and finally Durning-Lawrence Professor of history of art at UCL 1971–90.

White was also a poet; his published work includes a book of English poems translated into Japanese and published in Japan called The Breath in the Flute. His 24 collections of poetry are published online at doneforhtedoing.com. In addition, he wrote a collection of permutation poems that can be found at fifteenwords.com.

Although not a Buddhist, he had had a long association with a Buddhist temple, Shogyoji, a Shin Buddhist (Pure Land) Temple in southern Japan, as well as a branch of the temple, Three Wheels, in London. His 28 lectures given at Shogyoji, given over the course of 30 years, will soon be published online in English and Japanese at talksatshogyoji.com.

In the 1990s he also served on the Armed Forces Pay Review body which advises the UK government on armed forces salaries. 

In his later years, White was a glider pilot, having taken up gliding 50 years after he last piloted a Spitfire. He flew at The London Gliding Club, Dunstable and held the diamond certificate for glider pilots, having completed 500 km and 25.000 in altitude (achieved after his 80th birthday). He lived in London.
White had been collaborating with Prof. Taira Sato on new translations of the Haiku of three Japanese haiku masters who lived 500 years ago. The first book, 5 7 5 The Haiku of Basho, was published this year containing new translations of three hundred haiku. This mammoth work was started after his 93rd birthday.

White died on 6 November 2021, at the age of 97.

Selected works 
 The Birth and Rebirth of Pictorial Space, London : Faber and Faber, 1957. 
 book reviewed by Alfred Neumeyer in The Journal of Aesthetics and Art Criticism, Vol. 17, No. 1 (Sep. 1958), pp. 130–131, Blackwell Publishing on behalf of The American Society for Aesthetics
 Art and Architecture in Italy, 1250 to 1400, London/Baltimore : Penguin Books, 1966, 2nd edn 1987 (now Yale History of Art series).
 5 7 5 The Haiku of Basho. 2019. John White and Taira Sato. A new translation.
 Done For The Doing, Web, doneforthedoing.com
 Fifteen Words, A collection of permutation poetry, fifteenwords.com

Notes 

1924 births
2021 deaths
English art historians
Academics of University College London
Alumni of the Courtauld Institute of Art
Commanders of the Order of the British Empire
Fellows of the Society of Antiquaries of London
Johns Hopkins University faculty
People educated at Ampleforth College
Royal Air Force pilots of World War II
English expatriates in the United States
British glider pilots